The 2013–14 Nemzeti Bajnokság III football season had three geographically-based groups (East, Central and West) of sixteen teams. The winners of the groups promoted to next season's Nemzeti Bajnokság II, while the bottom three teams would play next season in the Hungarian County Championship. The 13th-placed teams had to play a qualifier to secure their spot at the third level of Hungarian football.

Western Group

Classification

Central Group

Classification

Eastern Group

References

External links
  
 Western
 Central
 Eastern

Hun
2013–14
3